Jack Cardiff,  (18 September 1914 – 22 April 2009) was a British cinematographer, film and television director, and photographer. His career spanned the development of cinema, from silent film, through early experiments in Technicolor, to filmmaking more than half a century later. 

He is best known for his influential color cinematography for directors such as Powell and Pressburger (A Matter of Life and Death, Black Narcissus, and The Red Shoes), John Huston (The African Queen) and Alfred Hitchcock (Under Capricorn). He is also known for his work as a director – in particular, his critically acclaimed film Sons and Lovers (1960) for which he was nominated for the Academy Award for Best Director. 

In 2000, he was appointed as an Officer of the Order of the British Empire and, in 2001, he was awarded an Academy Honorary Award for his contribution to the cinema.

Jack Cardiff's work is reviewed in the documentary film: Cameraman: The Life and Work of Jack Cardiff (2010) and Terry Johnson's stage play Prism (2017).

Early life
Cardiff was born in Great Yarmouth, Norfolk, the son of Florence and John Joseph Cardiff, music hall entertainers.  

He worked as an actor from an early age, both in the music hall and in a number of silent films: My Son, My Son (1918), Billy's Rose (1922), The Loves of Mary, Queen of Scots (1923) and Tip Toes (1927). At 15, he began working as a camera assistant, clapper boy and production runner for British International Pictures, including Alfred Hitchcock's The Skin Game (1931).

Cinematography
In 1935, Cardiff graduated to camera operator and occasional cinematographer, working mostly for London Films.  He was camera operator on the first film in Britain shot in Technicolor: Wings of the Morning (1937). When the Second World War began he worked as a cinematographer on public information films. He did a number of films on India where the British wanted to showcase the new capital city of Delhi.

The turning point in his career was as a second unit Technicolor camera operator on Powell and Pressburger's The Life and Death of Colonel Blimp (1943); they were sufficiently impressed to hire Cardiff as cinematographer on their post-war Technicolor A Matter of Life and Death (1946). Their collaboration continued with Black Narcissus (1947), which won Cardiff an Oscar and a Golden Globe, and The Red Shoes (1948). These films put Cardiff's talents in high demand, and a string of big-budget films followed.

In 1995, the British Society of Cinematographers conferred a lifetime achievement award on Cardiff.

Directorial work
In the late 1950s Cardiff began to direct, with two modest successes in Intent to Kill (1958) and Web of Evidence (1959). His version of D. H. Lawrence's novel Sons and Lovers (1960), starring Trevor Howard, Wendy Hiller and Dean Stockwell, was a hit, critically and at the box-office. It received seven Oscar nominations (including a Best Director nomination for Cardiff) and Freddie Francis won for Best Black-and-White Cinematography. Cardiff received a Golden Globe Award for Best Director.

Later life
After concentrating on direction in the 1960s, he returned to cinematography in the 1970s and 1980s, working on mainstream commercial films in the United States. One of the last films Cardiff photographed was at Pinewood Studios in 2004 when he lit veteran actor Sir John Mills in a short entitled Lights 2 (dir. Marcus Dillistone). The combined age of leading actor and cinematographer was a record 186 years.

Death
Cardiff died on 22 April 2009, aged 94, the same day as Ken Annakin, with whom he had worked on The Fifth Musketeer (1979). He was survived by his wife and his four sons.

Filmography
Jack Cardiff was the camera operator and then cinematographer for 73 films, documentaries and TV series between 1935 and 2007. These are some of the main films:

Cinematographer

Director

Awards and nominations 
Academy Awards

Other awards

Legacy
A feature-length documentary was made about Cardiff's life and career, Cameraman: The Life and Work of Jack Cardiff (2010) by Craig McCall. It took 17 years to make, and was not completed until after Cardiff had died. As well as many interviews with Cardiff, it included tributes from Sir John Mills, Martin Scorsese, Thelma Schoonmaker, Kathleen Byron, Kim Hunter, Moira Shearer, Lauren Bacall, Charlton Heston and Kirk Douglas. It was selected for the official selection of Cannes Classics at the Festival de Cannes in 2010, as well as four other important film festivals that year.

Cameraman: The Life and Work of Jack Cardiff was shown as part of the Great Yarmouth Arts Festival 2014 along with some of his photographs, often taken as preliminaries to lighting the films. Further celebrations to mark his birth date took place that September, particularly at the Time and Tide Museum in Great Yarmouth.

Cardiff's life was also explored in the 2017 stage play  Prism by Terry Johnson.

Bibliography
 Magic Hour (1996). Faber and Faber limited. . Foreword by Martin Scorsese.
 Conversations with Jack Cardiff: Art, Light and Direction in Cinema by Justin Bowyer

References

External links
 
 BFI: Jack Cardiff
 
 Jack Cardiff at the Powell & Pressburger pages
 BBC Forum Interview (2001)
 BBC Radio 4's The Film Programme special edition on Jack Cardiff
 Jack Cardiff Prints

1914 births
2009 deaths
Academy Honorary Award recipients
Best Cinematographer Academy Award winners
Best Director Golden Globe winners
English cinematographers
English film directors
Officers of the Order of the British Empire
People from Great Yarmouth